Mary Doreen Lobel (née Rogers)  (25 June 1900 – 1 December 1993) was an historian who edited several volumes of the Victoria County History and a three-volume British Atlas of Historic Towns.

Biography
Lobel was born Mary Doreen Rogers in Bristol on 25 June 1900.. Her father, Frederick William Rogers was a stone merchant and her mother was Blanche Mary, née Lyons. The family were strong suffragists, and would entertain suffragist gatherings. She was educated at Clifton High School and helped Walter Ewing Crum with cataloging translations for his Coptic dictionary.

Through Crum, she met Edgar Lobel, a research student 12 years her senior, and the couple were effectively engaged by 1918. In 1919, Lobel attended St. Hugh's College, Oxford, reading history and taught history at Norwich High School after she graduated in 1922.

The Lobels married on 24 August 1927 and moved to Oxford. Edgar died in 1982 and Lobel lived alone, suffering from Alzheimer's disease. She moved to Wardington House nursing home, Banbury where she died on 1 December 1993. She left her estate to St Hugh’s College, Somerville College, and the Historic Towns Trust.

Mary Lobel worked on the Victoria County History as a contributor to A History of the County of Oxford from the 1930s and as its Oxfordshire county editor from the 1950s until 1972. Thereafter she concentrated on editing the three-volume British Atlas of Historic Towns. While editing the Victoria County History, Lobel was also a librarian at Somerville College, Oxford.

Lobel was made an OBE in 1990.

Works

Victoria County History
Contributor: 
Editor, with Herbert E. Salter: 
Editor: 
Editor: 
Editor: 
Editor: 
Editor, with Alan Crossley: 
Contributor:

Atlas of Historic Towns
Editor: 
Editor:

References

1900 births
1993 deaths
Alumni of St Hugh's College, Oxford
English local historians
British medievalists
Women medievalists
Historians of the British Isles
Officers of the Order of the British Empire
Writers from Bristol
People educated at Clifton High School, Bristol
20th-century English historians
British women historians
Contributors to the Victoria County History
20th-century British women writers
Fellows of the Society of Antiquaries of London
Fellows of the Royal Historical Society